Michelle Simson (born July 10, 1953) is a Canadian politician, who was elected to represent the Ontario electoral district of Scarborough Southwest as a Member of Parliament from 2008 through 2011. She is a member of the Liberal Party.

Before being elected as an MP, she was the vice-president and general manager of a leasing firm located in Scarborough and was a former president of the Ontario Women's Liberal Commission.

After the election, Simson was a member of the Standing Committee on Access to Information, Privacy and Ethics and an associate member of the Standing Committee on Citizenship and Immigration, Standing Committee on Justice and Human Rights. She also sat as a member of the Standing Committee on the Status of Women.

She was also the Co-chair of the National Liberal Caucus Communications Committee and Treasurer of the GTA/Ontario Liberal Caucus.

Political career (2008–2011) 

On July 7, 2009, Simson made history by becoming the first federal politician in Canada to publicize her claimed expenses for the fiscal year on her website, saying:

"I have been a taxpayer a lot longer than I ever have been an MP, and as a taxpayer this was a real bone of contention. ... It was all about accountability. I may not succeed, but in my little piece of the world, my constituents can go on my website and will be able to see how the money is spent. It's their money. That's the bottom line."

On November 6, 2009, Simson's motion M-354, which called upon the government to develop and adopt a Universal Declaration on Animal Welfare, was unanimously adopted.

"This declaration is an agreement among people and nations to recognize that animals are sentient, suffer, have welfare needs, and to ultimately end animal cruelty worldwide. Thousands of Canadians have signed petitions in support of a UDAW and this declaration is actively supported by Canada's foremost animal protection organizations."

Simson was also a founding member and Co-Chair of the Parliamentary Committee on palliative and Compassionate Care (PCPCC), a non-partisan Parliamentary group aimed at promoting awareness of glaring deficiences in Canada's palliative and compassionate care framework.

After serving for just over two-and-a-half years as an MP, Simson ran for re-election in her Scarborough Southwest riding in 2011.  She was defeated, coming in third.

Electoral record

		

|-

|align="left" colspan=2|Liberal hold
|align="right"|Swing
|align="right"| -5.7
|align="right"|

Personal life 

Simson is married to husband George and they have one son, Eric.

References

External links

1953 births
Women members of the House of Commons of Canada
Members of the House of Commons of Canada from Ontario
Liberal Party of Canada MPs
Living people
Politicians from Toronto
Women in Ontario politics
21st-century Canadian politicians
21st-century Canadian women politicians